Juan Díaz Pardeiro (born 12 May 1976) is a Spanish actor.

Television
 La caza. Monteperdido (2019) as Gaizka on La 1.
 Conquistadores: Adventvm (2017) as Antonio Pigafetta on Cero
 Cuéntame cómo pasó (2014-) as Samuel on La 1
 Amar en tiempos revueltos (2011-2012) as Julio Segura on La 1
 Punta Escarlata (2011) as Rudy on Telecinco
 Los misterios de Laura (2011) as Quintín's brother on La 1
 Sin tetas no hay paraíso (2008) as El Buco on Telecinco
 Aquí no hay quien viva (2004-2005) as Álex Guerra Ruiz on Antena 3
 A las once en casa (1998-1999) as Luis on La 1
 La vida en el aire (1998) as Charly on La 2

References

External links

Spanish male television actors
1976 births
Living people